Consort Qian (1714 – 17 June 1767), a member of Han Chinese Liu clan, was a consort of Yongzheng Emperor.

Life

Family background 
Consort Qian was a member of Han Chinese Liu clan, later manchurised to "Liugiya". Her personal name was Xiangyu (香玉, literally: Tuberose)

Father: Liu Man (刘满), an official in the Ministry of Internal Affairs (pinyin: neiguanling)

Kangxi era 
The future Consort Qian was born in 1714.

Yongzheng era 
In 1729, lady Liu entered the Forbidden City at the age of fifteen, and was given the title of "Second Class Female Attendant Liu" (刘答应). In the following year, she was promoted to "Noble Lady Liu" (刘贵人). On 9 May 1733, Lady Liu gave birth to the sixth imperial prince Hongyan in Yuangmingyuan (圆明园), and was promoted to "Concubine Qian" (谦嫔; "qian" meaning "modest“, "amiable").

Qianlong era 
In 1735, after the coronation of Qianlong Emperor, Lady Liu was promoted to "Consort Qian" (谦妃). In 1737, Empress Dowager Chongqing ordered Hongyan to bestow rich gifts to his mother, so as to show his filial piety. The prince refused to send gifts assuming that he wouldn't dare to compete with Hongli.

According to the records of 1751, Lady Liu had six palace maids: Dege, Lianying, Fuge, Aishenzhu, Fengge, and Daniu.

Lady Liu died on 17 June 1767 at the age of fifty three. Her coffin was temporarily placed in Balitun Immortal Palace and later was interred at the Tai Mausoleum in Western Qing tombs.

Titles 
 During the reign of the Kangxi Emperor (r. 1661–1722):
 Lady Liugiya (from 1714)
 During the reign of the Yongzheng Emperor (r. 1722–1735):
 Second Class Female Attendant Liu (from 1729), eighth rank consort 
 Noble Lady Liu (from 1730), sixth rank consort 
 Concubine Qian (from 1733), fifth rank consort
 During the reign of the Qianlong Emperor (r. 1735–1796):
 Consort Qian (from 1735), fourth rank consort

Issue 
 As Noble Lady Liu:
 Hongyan, Prince Guogong of the Second Rank (果恭郡王 弘曕; 9 May 1733 – 27 April 1765)

See also
 Ranks of imperial consorts in China#Qing
 Royal and noble ranks of the Qing dynasty

References 

Consorts of the Yongzheng Emperor
1714 births
1767 deaths